Marie-Andrée is a French feminine given name. Notable people with the name include:

 Marie-Andrée Beaudoin, Canadian politician, borough mayor of Ahuntsic-Cartierville
 Marie-Andrée Bergeron (stage name Ima, born 1978), Canadian singer
 Marie-Andrée Bertrand (1925–2011), French-Canadian criminologist, feminist and anti-prohibitionist
 Marie-Andrée Cossette (born 1946), Canadian artist
 Marie-Andrée Lessard (born 1977), Canadian beach volleyball player
 Marie-Andrée Masson (born 1963), Canadian cross-country skier

See also
 Jean-Marie André
 André Marie
 André-Marie

French feminine given names
Compound given names
Feminine given names